Anagrammatic poetry is poetry with the constrained form that either each line or each verse is an anagram of all other lines or verses in the poem.

A poet that specializes in anagrams is an anagrammarian.

Writing anagrammatic poetry is a form of a constrained writing similar to writing pangrams or long alliterations.

List of anagrammatic poems
 Archive of Literary Anagrams: Hundreds of long anagrams of poetic and literary subjects  by over 50 contributors, including the longest literary anagram ever created.
Eight Poems in the Manner of OuLiPo, by Kevin McFadden
 Oh Damn! Must I Refrigerate?: Anagrammatic poem by Cory Calhoun of the title and first eight lines of Shakespeare's sonnet "The Marriage of True Minds."
 Dianagrams, Monica Lewinsky
 Rishi Talks to Katie: a dialogue between two high school students: a text's sentences are rearranged, then its words, then its letters
 In the French poem Ulcérations by Georges Perec, every line is an anagram of the title.
 The book Permutation City opens with an anagramatic poem.
 In the poem Washington Crossing the Delaware by David Shulman (1936), all 14 lines are anagrams of the title.
In the online book, ISOTOPES2 by Daniel Zimmerman, each line of the 14 line poems anagrams a 4 x 4 word square.
The Uncertainty of the Poet, by Wendy Cope, is a gentle poem that repeatedly shuffles its words.

See also
Vocabularyclept poem
Magnetic poetry

References

Genres of poetry
Word play